Nadel Paris (pronounced nuh-dell) is a French singer, songwriter, record producer, dancer, Electronic Dance Music (EDM) artist, and actor from Paris, based in Los Angeles. She is best known for her live shows and live renditions of her own songs.

Early life and career
Nadel Paris was born in France to a mother who was a Christian Dior model and a father who was a psychotherapist.

She signed with EMI France at the age of 12. She released her debut album, Oooh La La La La, following her singles “Freedom” and the Billboard Dance charting title track. She primarily collaborates with producer DJ M whom she knows from childhood.

She performed at the Avalon Hollywood on November 30, 2017, alongside DJ Ray Rhodes.

Paris is a contributor to Medium and writes regularly about dance, music and singing.

Discography

Charted singles

References

French women singers
Musicians from Paris
Living people
Year of birth missing (living people)